Antonio Tramaine Andrews (born August 17, 1992) is an American football running back who currently plays for the Cabo Marlins of the Mexican Professional Football League (Futbol Americano de Mexico). He played college football at Western Kentucky and was signed as an undrafted free agent by the Tennessee Titans of the National Football League (NFL). He was also a member of the Memphis Express of the AAF before their season began.

High school
Andrews played football for Fort Campbell High School. In his last two seasons, he went 29-0 as the starting quarterback and helped lead the team to two class 2A state championships. He was named Kentucky Mr. Football in 2009, his senior season. For his high school career, he threw for 3,365 yards and 50 touchdowns, and he rushed for 3,368 yards and 56 touchdowns.

College career
Andrews joined the Western Kentucky Hilltoppers in 2010 and played in nine games. He had 174 rushing yards and 429 all-purpose yards. In 2011, Andrews played in eight games. He had 505 kick return yards and 590 all-purpose yards. He had a career-best 75-yard kick return against Navy.

As a junior in 2012, Andrews became WKU's starting running back. He led the Sun Belt Conference in rushing yards (1,728), punt return yards (234), and kickoff return yards (767). He scored 15 total touchdowns. Andrews also led the FBS in all-purpose yards per game, and his 3,161 all-purpose yards for the season was the second-highest total in FBS history, behind only Barry Sanders in 1988. Andrews had over 300 all-purpose yards in the last four games of the regular season.

Andrews made the 2012 All-Sun Belt Conference Offense First-team, and he had been named the Sun Belt Conference Offensive Player of the Week three times that season. He was also a finalist for the Paul Hornung Award.

For his senior season, Andrews was named to the 2013 CFPA Running Back Trophy Watch List as one of the nation's top 36 running backs. He finished the season with 1,730 rushing yards on 267 carries. For his career, he had 3,674 rushing yards.

Professional career

Tennessee Titans
After going undrafted in the 2014 NFL draft, the Tennessee Titans agreed to a contract with Andrews. On August 29, 2014, he was released by the Titans. However, he was re-signed to the Titans' 10-man practice squad just two days later. He was activated on October 21, 2014.

Andrews made his NFL debut on November 23, 2014, against the Philadelphia Eagles. On September 27, 2015, Andrews scored his first career touchdown following a 12 carry, 49 yard performance against the Colts. On November 4, 2015, the Tennessee Titans fired head coach Ken Whisenhunt and named tight end coach Mike Mularkey the interim head coach. The following day, Mularkey named Andrews the starting running back. On December 13, 2015, Andrews threw his first career passing touchdown to Marcus Mariota for 41 yards. Andrews finished the 2015 season with 520 rushing yards on 143 attempts and 3 touchdowns.

Andrews began the  season as the third running back on the Titans' depth chart after they acquired DeMarco Murray and drafted Derrick Henry.

On March 7, 2017, it was reported that Andrews would remain an unrestricted free agent after the Tennessee Titans opted to not apply a restricted free agent tender on him.

Memphis Express
In 2018, Andrews signed with the Memphis Express of the Alliance of American Football (AAF) for the 2019 season. He was released before the season began.

Cabo Marlins
In November 2021, Andrews signed with Mexican team Cabo Marlins ahead of the 2022 Fútbol Americano de México season. However, he did not end up playing with the team.

References

External links
Western Kentucky Hilltoppers bio
ESPN profile

1992 births
Living people
American football running backs
Memphis Express (American football) players
People from Christian County, Kentucky
People from Enterprise, Alabama
Players of American football from Kentucky
Tennessee Titans players
Western Kentucky Hilltoppers football players